Abey is both a given name and a surname. Notable people with the name include:

 Abey Belasco (1797–1830), English boxer
 Abey Kuruvilla (born 1968), Indian cricketer
 Zach Abey, American football player

See also
 Abbey (disambiguation)